Mean Chey (lit. "Victorious") is an administrative district (khan) located in the south-eastern part of Phnom Penh, Cambodia. As of 2019, due to boundary changes, its population decreased from 2008 but is the second most populous district of Phnom Penh.

Administration 
According to the 1998 census, Mean Chey consisted of eight Sangkats with a total population of 157,112; the population recorded by the 2008 census was 266,865.

In 2010 Khan Mean Chey was expanded by incorporating four communes from Kien Svay District, Kandal Province: Kbal Kaoh, Preaek Aeng, Preaek Thmei and Veal Sbov. In 2013, the latter four Sangkats, along with Chbar Ampov Ti Muoy, Chbar Ampov Ti Pir, Nirouth and Preaek Pra formed a new entity, Khan Chbar Ampov, taking Mean Chey's number of Sangkats to four. In 2016, Stueng Mean Chey was split in three separate Sangkats and Boeng Tumpun was split in two parts.

As of 2020, Mean Chey is subdivided into seven Sangkats (communes) and 59 Phums (villages).

Education
Since 2015 the campus of the International School of Phnom Penh (ISPP) is on Hun Neang Boulevard, in Mean Chey Section.

Home of English International School Prek Eng Branch is in Mean Chey Section.

National Institute of Business (NIB) is located Next to New Steung Mean Chey Market on Street 217 in Mean Chey Section. It was established in 1979.

Buddhist temples
List of pagodas in Khan Mean Chey

 Wat Changkran Ta Prohm Steung Meanchey (Wat Steung Meanchey)
 Wat Sansam Kosal
 Wat Dombok Khpuos
 Wat Chak Angre Leu
 Wat Chak Angre Krom
 Wat Ang Porthi Nhean
 Wat Noun Mony
 Wat Samaki Raingsey

Gallery

References

Districts of Phnom Penh